

Alpine Skiing

Super-G

Giant Slalom

Slalom

2007 Canada Winter Games